Just Like Blood is the second studio album from British singer-songwriter Tom McRae. The All Music review said "McRae's anguished lyrics and hushed, processed vocals prove to be the album's undoing."

Track listing
 "A Day Like Today"
 "You Only Disappear"
 "Ghost of a Shark"
 "Stronger Than Dirt"
 "Overthrown"
 "Walking 2 Hawaii"
 "Mermaid Blues"
 "Karaoke Soul"
 "Line of Fire"
 "Human Remains"
 "Street Light" (US Bonus Tracks)
 "Walking 2 Hawaii (live/KCRW session" (US Bonus Tracks)

Personnel 

 Tom McRae – vocals (1–10), guitars (1–10), keyboards (1), programming (1), organ (3), percussion (3, 4), ARP synthesizers (7), string arrangement (8)
 Oli Kraus – cello (1–5, 7, 9, 10), piano (2, 5, 7), percussion (4), cello madness (6), ARP synthesizers (7), string arrangements (8), strings (8)
 John Hogg – bass (1–4, 7, 9), banjo (4), percussion (4), guitar (7), ARP synthesizers (7), piano (9)
 Ben Hillier – percussion (1, 2, 4, 10), drums (2, 4, 9), organ (2, 7), sitar (4), ARP synthesizers (7), Memory Man effects pedal (7), banjo (8)
 Paul Noonan – drums (3)
 Clive Jenner – drums (5, 10), percussion (10)
 Tony Marrison – bass (5, 10), piano (8), rhodes keyboard (10)
 Becky Doe – violin (5)
 Clive Deamer – drums (6, 8)
 Charlie Jones – bass (6, 8)
 Hossam Ramzy – percussion (8), additional strings (8)
 Lucy Wilkins – strings (8)
 Howard Gott – strings (8)
 Ruth Gotlieb – strings (8)
 Natalia Bonner – strings (8)

References

2003 albums
Tom McRae albums
Albums produced by Ben Hillier